Leonard Dorin Doroftei (also known as Leonard Dorin; born 10 April 1970) is a Romanian 
former boxer, the WBA Lightweight World Champion from 5 January 2002 to 24 October 2003.

Amateur highlights
Doroftei took up boxing at the age of 14 at the Ploieşti boxing club. From 1983 to 1984, he won every Romanian national junior title. He went on to win four national senior titles in 1992–1994 and 1997. He won bronze medals at the 1992 Summer Olympics in Barcelona and the 1996 Summer Olympics in Atlanta. In addition, he was declared World Champion in 1995 and European Champion in 1996. His record as an amateur was 239 victories and 15 defeats.

Olympic results
1992 (as a Light Welterweight)
 Defeated Edgar Ruiz (Mexico) 24–4
 Defeated Arlo Chavez (Philippines) 15–1
 Defeated Peter Richardson (Great Britain) points
 Lost to Mark Leduc (Canada) 6–32

1996 (as a Lightweight)
 Defeated Julio Mboumba (Gabon) RSC 23 (1:46)
 Defeated Sergey Kopenkin (Kyrgyzstan) 23–1
 Defeated Koba Gogoladze (Georgia) 23–8
 Lost to Hocine Soltani (Algeria) 32–9

Professional career

In 1997, Doroftei turned professional, signing with the Canadian club Interbox. Throughout his career, Dorin competed on ESPN, Showtime, and HBO. On 5 January 2002 he won the WBA world lightweight title, winning in a thrilling split decision over Argentinian boxer Raul Horacio Balbi 112–115, 114–113, 115–112. On 31 May the two fought again in Bucharest; this time, Dorin scored a knockdown en route to a clear cut unanimous decision victory, 118–111, 117–112 and 118–110.

A lightweight title unification bout on 17 May 2003 with American boxer Paul Spadafora, the IBF champion, ended in a draw, 114–114, 115–113, 114–115. The bout took place in Spadafora's hometown of Pittsburgh, and Dorin was a significant underdog. However, Dorin seemed to control the vast majority of the fight. He got to Spadafora early and often, surprising the champ with his intensity and workrate. Most observers agreed that Dorin had been robbed of a decision he deserved. Unfortunately for both fighters and boxing fans, a rematched never materialized.

On 24 October 2003, Doroftei was to fight a match against Panamanian boxer Miguel Callist. Doroftei had already announced that this would be his last professional match regardless of the result.

On 24 July 2004, Doroftei lost his undefeated mark when he tried to get the WBC title, getting knocked out with a body shot in two rounds by Arturo Gatti.

Retirement
He now resides in Romania with his wife and 3 children and is working as a trainer for boxing prospects. He has his own pub-restaurant in Ploieşti, which is decorated with his photos and memories from his boxing career. In November 2012, he was elected President of Romanian Boxing Federation.

Professional boxing record

{|class="wikitable" style="text-align:center; font-size:95%"
|-
!
!Result
!Record
!Opponent
!Type
!Round, time
!Date
!Location
!Notes
|-
|24
|Loss
|22–1–1
| align=left| Arturo Gatti
| KO
| 2 (12)
|Jul 24, 2004
|style="text-align:left;"| 
|style="text-align:left;"|
|-
|23
|Win
|22–0–1
| align=left| Charles Tschorniawsky
|TKO
| 4 (12)
|Mar 20, 2004
|style="text-align:left;"| 
|
|-
|22
|Draw
|21–0–1
| align=left| Paul Spadafora
|SD
|12
|May 17, 2003
|style="text-align:left;"| 
|style="text-align:left;"|
|-
|21
|Win
|21–0
| align=left| Raul Horacio Balbi
|UD
|12
|May 31, 2002
|style="text-align:left;"| 
|style="text-align:left;"|
|-
|20
|Win
|20–0
| align=left| Raul Horacio Balbi
|SD
|12
|Jan 05, 2002
|style="text-align:left;"| 
|style="text-align:left;"|
|-
|19
|Win
|19–0
| align=left| Emanuel Augustus
| UD
| 10
|Sep 28, 2001
|style="text-align:left;"| 
|
|-
|18
|Win
|18–0
| align=left| Martin O'Malley
|TKO
| 9 (10)
|Jul 21, 2001
|style="text-align:left;"| 
|style="text-align:left;"|
|-
|17
|Win
|17–0
| align=left| Darelle Sukerow
|KO
|5 (8)
|Dec 15, 2000
|style="text-align:left;"| 
|
|-
|16
|Win
|16–0
| align=left| Gairy St Clair
|UD
|10
|Sep 08, 2000
|style="text-align:left;"| 
|
|-
|15
|Win
|15–0
| align=left| Jose Aponte
|TKO
|8 (8)
|Jun 16, 2000
|style="text-align:left;"| 
|
|-
|14
|Win
|14–0
|align=left| Gustavo Fabian Cuello
|SD
|10
|Apr 06, 2000
|style="text-align:left;"| 
|
|-
|13
|Win
|13–0
| align=left| Rudolfo Lunsford
|UD
|8
|Mar 07, 2000
|style="text-align:left;"| 
|
|-
|12
|Win
|12–0
| align=left| Verdell Smith
|UD
|10
|Dec 10, 1999
|style="text-align:left;"| 
|
|-
|11
|Win
|11–0
|align=left| Darien Ford
|UD
|8
|Oct 29, 1999
|style="text-align:left;"| 
|
|-
|10
|Win
|10–0
|align=left| Jean-Luc Morin
|TKO
|3 (8)
|Oct 13, 1999
|style="text-align:left;"| 
|
|-
|9
|Win
|9–0
| align=left| Dillon Carew
|PTS
|12
|Apr 30, 1999
|style="text-align:left;"| 
|style="text-align:left;"|
|-
|8
|Win
|8–0
| align=left| Bernard Harris
|SD
|10
|Feb 05, 1999
|style="text-align:left;"| 
|
|-
|7
|Win
|7–0
|align=left| Steve Valdez
|TKO
|6 (8)
|Nov 27, 1998
|style="text-align:left;"| 
|
|-
|6
|Win
|6–0
| align=left| Khalil Shakeel
|UD
|8
|Nov 06, 1998
|style="text-align:left;"| 
|
|-
|5
|Win
|5–0
| align=left| Michael Balagna
|KO
|1 (6)
|Oct 14, 1998
|style="text-align:left;"| 
|
|-
|4
|Win
|4–0
| align=left| Don Sponagle
|TKO
|2 (6)
|Sep 24, 1998
|style="text-align:left;"| 
|
|-
|3
|Win
|3–0
|align=left| Sean Knight
|UD
|6
|May 28, 1998 
|style="text-align:left;"| 
|
|-
|2
|Win
|2–0
| align=left| Martin Aubut
|UD
|6
|May 05, 1998
|style="text-align:left;"| 
|
|-
|1
|Win
|1–0
| align=left| Jerry Villareal
|UD
|4
|Apr 24, 1998
|style="text-align:left;"| 
|

References

External links

 Leonard Doroftei's Official Site 
1991 Romanian National Championships
1992 Romanian National Championships
1993 Romanian National Championships
1994 Romanian National Championships
1997 Romanian National Championships

Canadian male boxers
Naturalized citizens of Canada
World boxing champions
World lightweight boxing champions
World Boxing Association champions
Lightweight boxers
Light-welterweight boxers
Romanian expatriates in Canada
Olympic boxers of Romania
Olympic bronze medalists for Romania
Boxers at the 1992 Summer Olympics
Boxers at the 1996 Summer Olympics
Olympic medalists in boxing
Sportspeople from Ploiești
1970 births
Living people
Romanian male boxers
AIBA World Boxing Championships medalists
Medalists at the 1996 Summer Olympics
Medalists at the 1992 Summer Olympics